About Love (Marathi: अबाउट लव्ह) is a 2019 Indian documentary film directed and edited by Archana Atul Phadke. Filmed over three years, the film follows three generations of the Phadke family living in the family home in southern Mumbai. It premiered at the 2019 Sheffield International Documentary Festival, where Phadke won the New Talent Award.

Plot 
The documentary follows three years in the life of the Hindu Phadke family living in Mumbai, Maharashtra, including family patriarch Madhav and his wife of 68 years, Neela; his son Atul and his wife Maneesha, who have been married for 32 years; and their children, including single daughters Archana and Sagarika, as well as their son Rohan, who is engaged to a Sikh woman, Gurbani. Also living in the home is Madhave's brother Laali; the family are assisted by their maid of 52 years, Sushila. The film, composed of footage recorded by Archana, includes scenes of domesticity, including arguments between Madhave and Neela, as well as Atul and Maneesha; preparations for Rohan's wedding; Madhave and Laali's declining health, including Madhave's eventual death and Laali's move into a care home; and Maneesha writing stories about Radha Krishna. 

Throughout the film, Archana and Sagarika are questioned on their unwillingness to get married, while Neela and Maneesha speak about the difficulties of being wives. The film culminates with Rohan's marriage, and his new wife Gurbani being formally welcomed into the family home.

Production 
About Love was filmed over the course of three years by Phadke, using a handheld camera, primarily within the multi-storey family home she had grown up in southern Mumbai, which had belonged to the Phadke family since 1902. Phadke had become a 2017 alumnus of Berlinale Talents, the Berlin International Film Festival's talent development programme, following the release of her short film Uski Baarish (2013); About Love is her first feature film as a director.

Release 
About Love premiered at the Sheffield International Documentary Festival in 2019. That same year, it was also screened at the Mumbai Film Festival, as part of the India Gold selection, and the Indian Film Festival of Stuttgart. The film was subsequently aired on PBS in the United States and on Mubi elsewhere.

Reception 
About Love has received a positive critical reception nationally and internationally.

In India, in a five star review, Mashable called it a "beautiful piece of cinema", though did criticise the quality of the handheld camera footage as at times distracting. Ishita Sengupta for The Indian Express commented on the film highlighting the role of women in Indian family structures, which are often patriarchal in nature, and called it "a lesson in owning [and] accepting your 'embarrassing' family".

Internationally, Ahendrila Goswani from High on Films called Phadke "comic as well as cruel" in how she portrayed her family, ultimately commending the "beauty" that emerged from its depiction of the mundaneness of the family's day to day life. Writing for Screen Daily, Nikki Baughan praised Phadke's "frank approach and eye for detail" in drawing poignancy from "quiet, unassuming moments". Deborah Young from The Hollywood Reporter called it a "small, unpretentious film about ordinary people".

Awards 
Phadke won the New Talent Award at the 2019 Sheffield International Documentary Festival for About Love. The film also won Best Film at the 2019 Indian Film Festival of Stuttgart.

References 

2019 documentary films